Camp is a comedy-drama television series that follows the antics of a group of campers and counselors at a lakeside summer camp named Little Otter Family Camp, run by director Mackenzie 'Mack' Granger played by Rachel Griffiths. The series was created by Liz Heldens and Peter Elkoff. Camp aired on NBC for one season from July 10 through September 11, 2013.

On October 1, 2013, NBC cancelled Camp after one season.

Cast and characters

Main cast
 Rachel Griffiths as Mackenzie 'Mac' Granger, the camp director 
 Thom Green as Kip Wampler, a newly joined uptight counsellor-in-training, whose leukemia has gone into remission for the second time.
 Lily Sullivan as Marina Barker, an outcast newcomer who befriends Kip. 
 Tim Pocock as Robbie Matthews, the head of activities, who has just finished college at the University of Virginia and been accepted into Stanford Law School.
 Dena Kaplan as Sarah Brennen, a college student at Stanford and elite swimmer.
 Charles Grounds as Buzz Granger, Mac's son. 
 Charlotte Nicdao as Grace, the adopted Asian daughter of Todd and Raffi. 
 Nikolai Nikolaeff as David "Cole" Coleman, the camp's maintenance officer.
 Rodger Corser as Roger Shepherd, the director of the rival camp Ridgefield.

Recurring cast
 Adam Garcia as Todd, Raffi's partner and Grace's father.
 Christopher Kirby as Raffi, Todd's partner and Grace's father.
 Genevieve Hegney as Sheila
 Natasha Bassett as Chloe
 Carmel Rose as Zoe
 Isabel Durant as Deanna 
 Jordan Rodrigues as Greg
 Liam Hall as Ryan
 Jonathan LaPaglia as Steve, Mac's ex-husband 
 Kat Stewart as Robbie's Mother
 Jodi Gordon as Kat, Steve's Russian girlfriend.
 Juan Pablo Di Pace as Miguel Santos

Development and production
On January 6, 2013, NBC bypassed the pilot order and green-lighted Camp with a direct-to-series order and a planned summer 2013 airdate. Thirteen episodes were originally ordered, however the episode order was decreased from thirteen to ten due to scheduling. Filming for the series began in Australia in March 2013, and was largely shot around the areas of Murwillumbah and Crams Farm Reserve in Northern New South Wales. The series was created by Liz Heldens and Peter Elkoff, who also serve as executive producers alongside Gail Berman, Lloyd Braun, and Gene Stein.

Casting
Casting announcements began in February 2013, with Thom Green first to be cast. Green is set to play the role of Kip Wampler, an adorable loner who likes indie rock and documentary films and hates people. Rachel Griffiths, Tim Pocock, and Dena Kaplan were next to come on board the series. Griffiths was cast in the role of Mackenzie Granger, the camp's director, who is reeling from being left by her husband for a younger woman; Pocock is set to play Robbie Matthews, the head of activities at the camp with lofty goals of attending law school, whilst Kaplan will portray Sarah, Robbie's summer romance. Rodger Corser then joined the cast as Roger Shepherd, the director of a rival summer camp. Nikolai Nikolaeff later signed on to the series as David "Cole" Coleman, the camp's food-, sex-, and weed-loving maintenance guy.

Episodes

Critical reception
On the review aggregator website Metacritic, the first season has scored 50 out of 100, based on 21 reviews, indicating "mixed or average reviews". Diane Werts from Newsday gave Camp its highest praise: "The characters, scripts and performances are surprisingly smart — almost, dare I say, deep. And you still get the comic humiliations, nasty rivalries and teeny bikinis." Daily Newss David Hinckley stated "It takes a village to make a Camp, and watching this crew work to save Little Otter and find summer love is far from the worst thing you could do." James Poniewozik from Time commented "Camp itself reveals a kind of throwback charm, recalling the kind of '70s and '80s summer-movie comedies...that had pathos and real-life problems beneath their water-balloon fights." The Washington Posts Hank Stuever thought the series "lusts after all the pop-culture sleep-away hijinks that preceded it...[t]hen it gets hosed down with the barest minimum of network programming standards." He added, "It's all good, clean fun that is not quite good, not quite clean and not quite fun." Linda Stasi from the New York Post stated, "If you hated summer camp, may I suggest you avoid NBC's horrible new scripted summer series, Camp like a case of poison sumac."

References

External links

2010s American comedy-drama television series
2013 American television series debuts
2013 American television series endings
English-language television shows
Television series by Universal Television
Television series about summer camps
NBC original programming
2010s American sex comedy television series
Television series by Matchbox Pictures